Nukuhifala is an islet of Wallis and Futuna. It is located off the east coast of Mata-Utu, Wallis Island. The only settlement is a tiny hamlet on the southwest coast. It lies on the outer coral reef. It has a population of four.

References

Islets of Wallis and Futuna